Maryse Luzolo (born 15 March 1995) is a German Olympic long jumper.

From Frankfurt where she was born and raised, she has parents from the Democratic Republic of the Congo. She attended the Carl von Weinberg School in Frankfurt.

Luzolo won the bronze medal at the 2014 World Junior Athletics Championships and was the 2017 German U23 champion before suffering knee injuries from a hyperextension which severely hampered her career.

She has been part of the German Armed Forces since 2016. In 2018 she began studying sports and geography at the Goethe University in Frankfurt. In December 2019 she won silver at the World Military Championship in Wuhan, China. It was her first international competition for two and a half years.

She was part of the German Olympic long jump team for the delayed 2020 Summer Games in Tokyo.

References

External links
 

Living people
1995 births
German female long jumpers
German sportspeople of Democratic Republic of the Congo descent
Sportspeople from Frankfurt
Athletes (track and field) at the 2020 Summer Olympics
Olympic athletes of Germany